Upper Blessington is a rural locality in the local government areas of Launceston and Break O'Day in the Launceston and North-east regions of Tasmania. The 2016 census determined a population of 61 for the state suburb of Upper Blessington.

History
For the origin of the name, see Blessington, Tasmania. 

Upper Blessington was gazetted as a locality in 1974.

Geography
The North Esk River forms a small section of the northern boundary and then flows south through the locality before exiting in the south-west where it forms a section of that boundary.

Road infrastructure
Route C401 (Blessington Road / Upper Blessington Road) passes through from west to east. The C405 route (Camden Road) starts at an intersection with C401 and exits to the north-west. The C432 route (Ben Lomond Road) starts at an intersection with C401 and runs south-east before exiting.

References

Localities of City of Launceston
Localities of Break O'Day Council
Towns in Tasmania